Nation's Restaurant News (NRN) is an American trade publication, founded in 1967, that covers the foodservice industry, including restaurants, restaurant chains, operations, marketing, and events. It was owned by Penton Media (acquired by Informa on November 2, 2016), who purchased it from founding company Lebhar-Friedman in December 2010. Nation's Restaurant News's sister publications are Restaurant Hospitality, Food Management, Supermarket News, and MUFSO (Multi-Unit Food Service Operators).

Nation's Restaurant News is published bi-weekly, with an online portal that launched in 1996.

Nation's Restaurant News has over 60,000 monthly print subscribers.

Awards
Jesse H. Neal for Best Media Brand (March 29, 2019)

References

External links
 

Biweekly magazines published in the United States
Business magazines published in the United States
Food and drink magazines
Magazines established in 1967
Magazines published in New York City
Professional and trade magazines
1967 establishments in the United States